was a Japanese hurdler. He competed in the men's 400 metres hurdles at the 1936 Summer Olympics.

References

1915 births
2001 deaths
Athletes (track and field) at the 1936 Summer Olympics
Japanese male hurdlers
Olympic athletes of Japan
Place of birth missing
20th-century Japanese people